Kinney may mean:

People
 Abbot Kinney, a developer and conservationist
Antoinette Kinney, a Utah state senator 
 Asa Kinney, American pioneer and politician
 Bob Kinney, an American professional basketball player
 Charles Kinney, an Ohio politician and attorney
 Dennis Kinney, a former Major League Baseball pitcher
 Dick Kinney, an American animator and comic book writer
 Emily Kinney, an American actress and singer
 Erron Kinney, a former American college and professional football player
 Fern Kinney, an American R&B and disco singer
 Garrett D. Kinney, an American politician
 Harry E. Kinney, three times Mayor of Albuquerque
 Henry Kinney, an American politician
 Jack Kinney, an American animator, director and producer of animated shorts
 James Kinney, a politician in Alberta, Canada
 Jay Kinney, an American author, editor, and former underground cartoonist
 Jeff Kinney (American football), football athlete
 Jeff Kinney (writer)
 John Francis Kinney (1937-2019), an American Roman Catholic bishop
 John F. Kinney (1816-1902), an American attorney, judge, and politician
 John Kinney (outlaw) (c. 1847-1919), American outlaw
 Joseph Kinney Jr., American politician
 Joseph Robbins Kinney, a merchant, notary public and political figure in Nova Scotia, Canada
 Josh Kinney, an American professional baseball pitcher
 Kathy Kinney, actress
 Kelvin Kinney, an American football defensive lineman
 Kevn Kinney, an American vocalist and guitarist
 Matt Kinney, a former American professional baseball pitcher
 Ole G. Kinney, an American politician
 Ray Kinney, a singer, musician, composer, orchestra leader
 Sean Kinney, an American musician
 Steven Kinney, an American soccer player
 Taylor Kinney, an American actor and model
 Terry Kinney, an American actor and theatre director
 Thomas Kinney, a Missouri state senator and St. Louis organized crime figure
 Troy Kinney, a notable American artist, etcher, and author
 Walt Kinney, a pitcher in Major League Baseball
 William Kinney (Illinois politician) (1781–1843), American politician
 William Ansel Kinney (1860–c. 1930), American politician
 William Burnet Kinney (1799-1880), American politician

Fictional characters 
 Brian Kinney, character from Queer as Folk
 Laura Kinney, Marvel Comics character better known as X-23
 Gabby Kinney, Marvel Comics character, sidekick of X-23

Places
United States
 Kinney, Minnesota
 Kinney County, Texas
 Kenney, Texas, a community also called "Kinney"
 Kinney Run, a stream in Pennsylvania

Canada
 Kinney Lake, in British Columbia

Other uses
 G.R. Kinney Company, shoe manufacturer
 Kinney Drugs
 Kinney National Company, media company that became Warner Communications
 Kinney Parking Company, conglomerate that formed Kinney National Company

See also

 Kenney (disambiguation)
 Kenny (disambiguation)
 Kinne (disambiguation)
 Kinnie (disambiguation)
 McKinney (disambiguation)
 
 McKinney (surname)
 Clan Mackenzie
 Sleater-Kinney, a punk rock trio
 Sleater-Kinney (album)